Justin Peck (born September 8, 1987) is an American choreographer, director, and dancer associated with New York City Ballet, of which he was appointed Resident Choreographer in July 2014, being the second person in the history of the institution to hold this title. In 2018 he won the Tony Award for Best Choreography for his work on the third Broadway revival of Rodgers and Hammerstein's Carousel. Peck also choreographed the 2021 Steven Spielberg film West Side Story, an adaptation of the musical.

Early life 
Peck was born in Washington, D.C., and grew up in San Diego, California. He began tap dancing when he was nine years old, after seeing a performance of Bring in 'da Noise. When Peck was 13, he witnessed a performance of American Ballet Theatre in Giselle which inspired him to begin training in the ballet form.

Career 
At 15 years old, Peck moved to New York City to attend the School of American Ballet. In 2006, when he was 18 years old, he was invited by Peter Martins to join the New York City Ballet as an apprentice. In June 2007, he was promoted to corps de ballet. In February 2013, he was promoted to soloist. At New York City Ballet, Peck has danced extensive repertoire, performing in existing and new works by George Balanchine, Jerome Robbins, Peter Martins, Benjamin Millepied, Alexei Ratmansky, Lynne Taylor-Corbett, and Christopher Wheeldon.

In 2008, Peck choreographed his first ballet. He has since created more than 25 works, for companies such as New York City Ballet, San Francisco Ballet, Pacific Northwest Ballet, Miami City Ballet, LA Dance Project, and Paris Opera Ballet.

Alastair Macaulay, the chief dance critic at The New York Times, described Peck in an article as "the third important choreographer to have emerged in classical ballet this century." In 2014, Peck was named the New York City Ballet's Resident Choreographer, the youngest and only the second ever to hold the position.

Peck is the focus of the 2014 Jody Lee Lipes documentary Ballet 422.

Peck has worked with composers Sufjan Stevens, Bryce Dessner (of the band The National), Caroline Shaw, Dan Deacon, Steve Reich, and Philip Glass. He has also collaborated with visual artists Shepard Fairey, Marcel Dzama, Sterling Ruby, John Baldessari, Steve Powers, George Condo;  fashion designers Humberto Leon (Opening Ceremony, Kenzo), Dries Van Noten, Tsumori Chisato, Mary Katrantzou, and Prabal Gurung; and directors Steven Spielberg, Sofia Coppola, Damian Chazelle, and Jody Lee Lipes.

He has contributed to the fashion world, working with Vogue, Harper's Bazaar, Nowness, Vogue China, Vogue Australia, DuJour magazine, Vulture, New York Magazine, and others.

The New York Times has proclaimed that "Mr. Peck has quickly become the most eminent choreographer of ballet in the United States," and that "young Mr. Peck can do anything he wants with choreography: a virtuoso of the form."

Peck provided the choreography for the third Broadway revival of Rodgers and Hammerstein's Carousel in 2018 at the Imperial Theatre. Peck has received numerous award nominations for his work on the production including a Tony Award for Best Choreography.

Ballet 422 
Ballet 422 follows Peck's process of creating Paz de la Jolla for the New York City Ballet, focusing on aspects such as choreography, staging, lighting, and costumes. The movie was filmed and directed by Jody Lee Lipes, an American cinematographer known for his cinematography in the television show Girls and film Manchester by the Sea.

Personal life 
Peck is married to former Miami City Ballet principal dancer Patricia Delgado. They welcomed their daughter in March 2021.

Awards and nominations 
 In 2013, Peck's Year of the Rabbit was a nomination for the Benois De La Danse.
 In 2015, Peck's Rodeo: Four Dance Episodes received a Bessie Award for Outstanding Production. This work received a nomination for the Benois De La Danse in 2016.
 Peck was awarded the 2018 Tony Award for Best Choreography for Rodger's and Hammerstein's Carousel
 Peck was awarded the 2018 Drama Desk Award for Outstanding Choreography for Rodger's and Hammerstein's Carousel
 Peck was awarded the 2018 Outer Critics Circle Award for Rodger's and Hammerstein's Carousel
 Peck was awarded the 2018 Ted Arison Young Arts Awards at the National Arts Awards.
 Peck received the Golden Plate from the American Academy of Achievement presented by Awards Council member Edward Villella in 2019.

Selected works 
 In Creases (2012) – New York City Ballet
 Year of the Rabbit (2012) – New York City Ballet
 Paz de la Jolla (2013) – New York City Ballet
 Chutes and Ladders (2013) – Miami City Ballet
 Capricious Maneuvers (2013) – New York City Ballet
 Murder Ballades (2013) – LA Dance Project
 Everywhere We Go (2014) – New York City Ballet
 Belles-Lettres (2014) – New York City Ballet
 Debonair (2014) – Pacific Northwest Ballet
 Helix (2014) – LA Dance Project
 Rodeo: Four Dance Episodes (2015) – New York City Ballet
 Heatscape (2015) – Miami City Ballet
 New Blood (2015) – New York City Ballet
 The Most Incredible Thing (2016) – New York City Ballet
 In the Countenance of Kings (2016) – San Francisco Ballet
 Entre chien et loup (2016) – Paris Opera Ballet
 Scherzo Fantastique (2016) – New York City Ballet
 The Dreamers (2016) – New York City Ballet
 The Times Are Racing (2017) – New York City Ballet
 The Decalogue (2017) - New York City Ballet
 Pulcinella Variations (2017) – New York City Ballet
 Hurry Up, We're Dreaming (2018) - San Francisco Ballet
 Easy (2018) - New York City Ballet
 Principia (2019) - New York City Ballet
 Reflections (2019) - Houston Ballet
 Bright (2019) - New York City Ballet
 Rotunda (2020) - New York City Ballet

References

! colspan="3" | New York City Ballet
|-

1987 births
21st-century American dancers
Living people
New York City Ballet soloists
Ballet choreographers
Choreographers of New York City Ballet
21st-century ballet dancers
Tony Award winners
Drama Desk Award winners
Dancers from Washington, D.C.
People from San Diego